Édouard Ferrand (25 April 1965 – 1 February 2018) was a French politician and a member of National Front.

He was a Front National MEP and regional councillor in Burgundy. In 2009, he was selected to be National Front's candidate in Burgundy for the 2010 regional elections. He was elected to the European Parliament in May 2014.

References

1965 births
2018 deaths
Politicians from Lyon
MEPs for South-West France 2014–2019
National Rally (France) MEPs